Brother of the Wind is a 1972 independent film directed by and starring Richard Robinson from a screenplay by John Mahon and John Champion. A mountain man saves four wolf cubs after their mother dies.

Reception
The film was released by Sun International and earned theatrical rentals of $12 million in the United States and Canada.

References

External links
 

1972 films